Tripleurospermum maritimum (syn. Matricaria maritima) is a species of flowering plant in the aster family commonly known as false mayweed or sea mayweed. It is found in many coastal areas of Northern Europe, including Scandinavia and Iceland, often growing in sand or amongst beach pebbles.

In Iceland, sea mayweed is known as Baldr's eyelashes (baldursbrá), though this name is given to all  mayweed flowers in Norway and Sweden.

Description
As with many maritime plants, it is a halophyte with fleshy leaves which help it to survive in the harsh salty environment. The leaves are divided into short segments. When crushed, they yield a sweet smell similar to that of its relative chamomile, though much fainter.

The daisy-like flowers usually appear between July and September and can reach up to 50 mm across. The stems of the plant are frequently tinged red towards the base.

Habitat
Found around the coast in the uppershore and waste ground.

References

External links

Anthemideae
Plants described in 1753
Taxa named by Carl Linnaeus